#WeThe15 is a global human rights movement which aims to make persons with disabilities, who make up 15% of the world's population (1.2 billion people), visible. An initiative of the International Paralympic Committee and the International Disability Alliance, it is supported, by a number of organisations from the world of disability sports, disability rights, non-governmental and governmental organisations. It was launched as part of the 2020 Summer Paralympics in 2021. Landmarks across the world were lit up in purple to coincide with the opening ceremony. The movement was given particular focus during the closing ceremony.

A TV campaign in August 2021 showcased people with disabilities, not just as "special", or "inspiring", but as normal people—with the same challenges as non-disabled people—who must not be ignored, but included.

Founding organisations

 Disability sports organizations
International Paralympic Committee
Special Olympics
Deaflympics
Invictus Games
 Activist and innovation organizations
International Disability Alliance
International Disability and Development Consortium
Zero Project
ATscale
CTalent
The Valuable 500
 Multinational organizations
European Commission
UNESCO
Office of the High Commissioner for Human Rights
Global Goals Advisory
Sustainable Development Goals Action Campaign
Alliance of Civilizations

References

External links

Disability rights organizations
Organizations established in 2021
International human rights organizations
Campaigning
Hashtags
International Paralympic Committee